Biurea is a chemical compound with the molecular formula C2H6N4O2.  It is produced in food products containing azodicarbonamide, a common ingredient in bread flour, when they are cooked.  Upon exposure, biurea is rapidly eliminated from the body through excretion.

Biurea is produced from urea and hydrazine by transamidation.  Its major use is as a chemical intermediate in the production of azodicarbonamide, a common blowing agent.

References

External links
 Biurea, NLM Hazardous Substances Data Bank

Semicarbazides
Ureas